4-Methylpentanoic acid is a carboxylic acid of five carbons with methyl substitution at fourth carbon. It is also called 4-methylvaleric acid or isocaproic acid.

References

Alkanoic acids